Hallimäe is a village in Rõuge Parish, Võru County in Estonia. The population has been 4 since 2021

References

Villages in Võru County